The John Haines House is a -story Queen Anne style house in the Fort Street Historic District of Boise, Idaho. Designed by Tourtellotte & Co. and constructed in 1904, the house features a veneer of rectangular cut stone applied to the first story and shingled, flared walls at the second story. Turrets accent the front two corners of the house, and a classical porch with doric columns and a flattened pediment separates the offset main entrance from the street. It was included as a contributing property in the Fort Street Historic District on November 12, 1982. The house was individually listed on the National Register of Historic Places on November 17, 1982.

John M. Haines was a real estate developer and Republican who served as mayor of Boise City 1907-1909 and as Governor of Idaho 1913–1915.

See also
 Tourtellotte & Hummel

References

External links
 

Queen Anne architecture in Idaho
Houses completed in 1904
Houses in Boise, Idaho
Houses on the National Register of Historic Places in Idaho
National Register of Historic Places in Boise, Idaho
Individually listed contributing properties to historic districts on the National Register in Idaho